Samuel Gbenga Okunowo (born 1 March 1979) is a Nigerian retired footballer who played mainly as a right back.

Injury affected the vast majority of his professional career, which was spent in eight countries other than his own.

Club career
Born in Ibadan, Okunowo signed with La Liga club FC Barcelona at the age of 18. In the 1998–99 season he competed for the starting spot in the first team with Michael Reiziger, and managed 21 appearances all competitions comprised (15 starts) as the Catalans went on to win the national championship.

However, Okunowo did not manage to remain with Barça, going on to serve two unassuming loans, with Portugal's S.L. Benfica and Spanish second division club CD Badajoz and being released in June 2002. He went on to represent – with very little impact as well – teams in four countries: Greece, Romania, Albania and Ukraine.

In 2007, Okunowo was on trial at Northwich Victoria of the Conference National and Vilanova del Camí in the Spanish amateur leagues, but nothing came of it. Two years later, he returned to active with VB Sports Club in the Maldives; in October 2009, however, he joined England's Waltham Forest, playing in a league eight levels below the Premier League.

In February 2010, Okunowo underwent a trial with Polish Ekstraklasa side Odra Wodzislaw, in an attempt to return to top flight football, but nothing materialized. He also met the same fate whilst looking for a club in Norway.

On 5 January 2012, Okunowo returned to his homeland and signed with Sunshine Stars F.C. for one Nigerian Premier League campaign. He retired the following year, aged 34.

International career
Okunowo represented Nigeria at the 1999 FIFA World Youth Championship (helping the hosts reach the quarter-finals), the 2000 African Cup of Nations and the 2000 Summer Olympics, winning eight caps with the senior team.

Personal life
In July 2012, Okunowo lost all his possessions when a fire broke in his mansion in Ibadan. He subsequently reached out for help from former club Barcelona, which obliged.

References

External links

1979 births
Living people
Sportspeople from Ibadan
Yoruba sportspeople
Nigerian footballers
Association football defenders
Nigeria Professional Football League players
Shooting Stars S.C. players
La Liga players
FC Barcelona players
FC Barcelona Atlètic players
CD Badajoz players
Primeira Liga players
S.L. Benfica footballers
Ionikos F.C. players
Liga I players
FC Dinamo București players
Ukrainian Premier League players
FC Metalurh Donetsk players
FC Stal Alchevsk players
KF Tirana players
Waltham Forest F.C. players
Nigeria under-20 international footballers
Nigeria international footballers
2000 African Cup of Nations players
Olympic footballers of Nigeria
Footballers at the 2000 Summer Olympics
Nigerian expatriate footballers
Expatriate footballers in Spain
Expatriate footballers in Portugal
Expatriate footballers in Greece
Expatriate footballers in Romania
Expatriate footballers in Albania
Expatriate footballers in Ukraine
Expatriate footballers in the Maldives
Expatriate footballers in England
Nigerian expatriate sportspeople in Spain
Nigerian expatriate sportspeople in Portugal
Nigerian expatriate sportspeople in Greece
Nigerian expatriate sportspeople in Romania
Nigerian expatriate sportspeople in Albania
Nigerian expatriate sportspeople in Ukraine
Nigerian expatriate sportspeople in the Maldives
Nigerian expatriate sportspeople in England